Passage is a Canadian documentary film, directed by Sarah Baril Gaudet and released in 2020. The film is a portrait of Gabrielle Goupil and Yoan Duchesne, two teenagers in the Abitibi-Témiscamingue region of Quebec, over the summer when they are facing choices about their future as young adults; Yoan wants to move to the big city so that he can safely come out as gay, while Gabrielle is conflicted about whether she wants to leave to attend university, or stay at home.

The film premiered at the 2020 Montreal International Documentary Festival.

The film received two Prix Iris nominations at the 23rd Quebec Cinema Awards in 2021, for Best Cinematography in a Documentary (Baril Gaudet) and the Public Prize.

References

External links

2020 films
2020 documentary films
2020 LGBT-related films
Canadian documentary films
Canadian LGBT-related films
2020s French-language films
2020s Canadian films
French-language Canadian films
Documentary films about gay men